The New Zealand national cricket team toured South Africa from October 1961 to February 1962 and played a five-match Test series against the South Africa national cricket team. The series was drawn 2–2, with New Zealand's victory in the third Test the team's first Test match win outside their home country. New Zealand captain John Reid scored a total of 1,915 runs during the tour, setting a record for the most runs scored in South Africa by a touring batsman. The tour was the second to South Africa by a team from New Zealand, the previous tour having taken place in 1953–54.

After South Africa withdrew from the British Commonwealth in 1961,  the tour was not deemed official as the country was no longer a member of the Imperial Cricket Conference (ICC). Despite this, the international matches on the tour have always been considered to have Test match status.

Due to the sporting boycott of South Africa during the apartheid era, no official Test cricket was played by South Africa after 1970, with an effective moratorium on international tours to the country after a resolution passed by the ICC opposing the apartheid system. As a result, New Zealand did not tour the country again until 1994–95, after the end of the apartheid regime and the reintegration of South Africa into international sport in 1991.

Tour party

The New Zealand side was captained by John Reid with Murray Chapple as the vice-captain. Reid was by far the most experienced member of the side with 34 Test caps; other than Noel McGregor with 15, no other member of the side had more than 10 caps to their name and eight players on the tour had not made their Test debut. Six of these went on to play in the Test matches on the tour, with only John Ward and Bryan Yuile not playing in any of the Tests.

New Zealand's outstanding post-war batsman, Bert Sutcliffe, had retired from Test cricket and was not available for the tour, although he came back into the side for the 1965 tour of India, Pakistan and England at the age of 41. Experienced players Bob Blair and Alex Moir were not selected for the tour.

The manager of the team was Gordon Leggat. Leggat played in one of the non-first-class matches on the tour.

A protest against the South African apartheid regime took place during the squad selection meeting in Christchurch. The team was the last from New Zealand to visit apartheid-era South Africa; the next New Zealand team to tour the country did so in 1994/95, after the end of the sporting boycott of South Africa.

Tour itinerary
The tour took place between October 1961 and March 1962. The New Zealanders travelled to and from South Africa via Australia. They played a first-class match against Western Australia on the outward leg of their journey and matches against South Australia and New South Wales on the return journey, the only matches played in March.

A total of 21 matches were played in South Africa during the tour, including the five Test matches, as well as three played in Rhodesia. Eleven matches, seven of which were first-class, were played during the period between October and December, before the first Test match. These included three matches, two of which were first-class, in Rhodesia. Another eight matches, six of which were first-class, were played between the Test matches, including five in January 1962 between the third and fourth Tests.

Test series

All of the Test matches during the tour were four-day matches. Each side won two of the five matches with one drawn Test, leaving the series drawn.

First Test
The first Test match of the tour was held at Kingsmead Cricket Ground in Durban, beginning on 8 December 1961. Seven of the South African team and five New Zealanders made their Test debuts in the match. The South African team was captained by Jackie McGlew in his final series.

South Africa won the toss and chose to bat, scoring 292 runs in their first innings, and innings anchored by McGlew who carried his bat with a score of 127. Only Roy McLean, who scored 63, made a score of more than 25 runs and Wisden commented that the batting of the new South African players, other than Colin Bland, was "disappointing" throughout the match. In reply New Zealand scored 245 runs, with Paul Barton and Zin Harris both making half-centuries, leaving South Africa with a lead of 47 runs after the first innings.

After a rest day on Sunday 10 December, South Africa resumed their second innings. When Bland was fourth man out with the score on 110 they appeared well placed to build a big lead, but collapsed in less than an hour to be all out for 149, leaving New Zealand to score 197 runs with more than a days play remaining. They failed to reach their target and were all out for 166 after what Wisden called "rank bad batting", with South Africa winning the match by just 30 runs. Peter Pollock, on his Test debut aged 20, took a five-wicket haul with six wickets for a cost of 38 runs in the innings and nine wickets in the match.

Second Test
The second Test match began on Boxing Day at Wanderers in Johannesburg. McGlew again won the toss and chose to bat, John Waite scoring a century in South Africa's first innings score of 322 runs. Frank Cameron took five wickets in the innings. Rain had restricted play to only 80 minutes on the first day, and New Zealand did not begin their reply until the final session of the second day. They scored 223 in their innings, with Godfrey Lawrence taking eight wickets for 53 runs, the best bowling figures in Test matches by a South African fast bowler. Debutant Graham Dowling top scored for New Zealand with 74.

McGlew declared South Africa's second innings at 178/6, leaving New Zealand with a target of 278 runs in around four hours play. They reached 165 runs for the loss of four wickets and the match was drawn, with Wisden lamenting the loss of time to rain on the first day. Dowling scored a second half century, with John Reid top scoring with 75 not out.

Third Test

The third Test was played at Newlands in Cape Town, beginning on New Year's Day. Reid won the toss for the first time in the series and New Zealand chose to bat, scoring 385 runs in their first innings, attacking the South African bowling after losing early wickets. Reid scored a "pulsating" 92 runs before Murray Chapple and Zin Harris put on 148 runs for the fifth wicket, Harris scoring his maiden Test century before being stumped for 101. Sydney Burke, making his debut for South Africa, took six wickets, including four cheap ones on the second morning of the match. Buster Farrer also made his debut for South Africa in the match.

In reply South Africa were bowled out for 190 runs, Cameron taking a five-wicket haul. Reid did not enforce the follow on and New Zealand scored 212 runs before declaring with nine wickets down, Burke taking another five wickets for 11 on debut.

South Africa required 407 runs to win the match. McGlew, who suffered a hand injury, made 63 runs and McLean a century in under three hours, but the South Africans were bowled out for 335, New Zealand winning by 72 runs. The victory, which Wisden described as a "thriller", was their second in Test matches and their first away from home.

Fourth Test
The fourth Test was played at the beginning of February, with Wanderers being used again to host the match. Burke was dropped, despite his bowling display in the previous Test, and Peter Heine returned to the South African team after an absence of three years. It was to be his last Test match. Tiger Lance made his Test debut for the South Africans, the side's tenth new cap of the series.

Reid won the toss again and opted to bat, but New Zealand were dismissed for 164 runs in their first innings, with Godfrey Lawrence taking another five-wicket haul at Wanderers. Only Reid, who played a "glorious innings" for 60, scored more than 22 runs. South Africa replied with a score of 464, with an opening partnership of 134 and another century from McGlew, the seventh and last of his Test match career. Facing a deficit of over 300, New Zealand lost both opening batsmen for ducks and were all out for 249. Reid again dominated the innings, scoring 142, but his side lost by an innings and 51 runs with a full day to play. The match saw South African wicket-keeper John Waite take his 24th dismissal of the series, breaking the world record for dismissals in a five-match series by a wicket-keeper with a match remaining.

Fifth Test

The final Test match of the series was played at St George's Oval in Port Elizabeth, beginning on 16 February. Reid won the toss for the third match in a row and chose to bat on what Wisden described as a "batsman's wicket".

The New Zealanders scored 275 runs, with Paul Barton top-scoring with 109, scoring his only Test century in an innings Wisden described as "composed, correct and polished". In reply South Africa scored 190, with opening batsman McGlew, playing in his final Test, suffering from an injured shoulder and not batting until ninth in the batting order as a result. New Zealand were then bowled out for 228 runs in their second innings, leaving South Africa requiring 314 to win the match.

The second South African innings was in trouble at 199 for the loss of eight wickets, until a ninth wicket stand of 60 runs brought them to within 60 runs of the target. They lost their final two wickets, the last falling with only 21 minutes of play remaining in the match. to leave New Zealand the winners by 40 runs, levelling the series at 2 wins apiece. Waite took two more dismissals to take his total for the Test matches to 26, at the time the most by a wicket-keeper in a five-match Test series. New Zealand's wicket-keeper Artie Dick took five dismissals during the match, leaving him with a total of 23 for the series, equalling the previous record.

Other matches
The New Zealanders played 22 other matches during the tour. Three of these were played in Australia, one on the outward leg of the journey and two on the return. In total, 16 matches of these matches were considered first-class, including all three matches played in Australia. An additional match was played after the team returned to New Zealand against a touring side.

Outward journey
New Zealand arrived in Perth on 8 October 1961 and spent three days practicing before playing a first-class match against Western Australia.

Early tour matches
After arriving in South Africa on 17 October, the New Zealand side travelled first to Southern Rhodesia to play three matches, two of which were first-class, against Rhodesian teams in October, narrowly avoiding defeat in the first match. They then travelled back to South Africa and played eight matches before the first Test. Five of these matches were first-class.

After returning from Rhodesia, the New Zealanders played eight matches before the first Test match in early December.

Mid tour matches
Between the first and second Tests, the New Zealanders played first-class matches in Pretoria and Benoni. The second and third Tests were played over the Christmas and New Year period without any intervening fixtures, and were followed by five fixtures, three of which were first-class, before the fourth Test. A single first-class match was played in East London between the fourth and fifth Tests.

The second Test started on 26 December and the third on 1 January after which the New Zealanders played five more matches before the fourth Test match.

After the fourth Test match, which was scheduled to be played between 2–6 February, the New Zealanders played one first-class match against Border before the final Test match began on 16 February.

Return journey
After leaving South Africa after the final Test at the end of February, the New Zealanders played two first-class matches against Australian sides on the return journey. Immediately after arriving back in New Zealand, a further first-class match was played against a Commonwealth XI. The New Zealand side featured exclusively players from the touring side.

Notes

References

Further reading
 Whitington RS (1962) John Reid's Kiwis. Christchurch: Whitcombe & Tombs.

External links
New Zealand in South Africa, 1961–62, Wisden Cricketers' Almanack
 Test Cricket Tours – New Zealand to South Africa 1961–62 (archived June 2020)

1961 in New Zealand cricket
1961 in South African cricket
1962 in New Zealand cricket
1962 in South African cricket
1961
South African cricket seasons from 1945–46 to 1969–70
International cricket competitions from 1960–61 to 1970